Alan Mehdizadeh (born 4 September 1982) is a British-Iranian actor, appearing on stage and screen. He has recently played the role of Monk in Graham Moore's The Outfit. He played the role of Don in the West End musical, Kinky Boots.
He is also a talent agent, and runs London-based agency Avenue Management.

Early life 
Alan Mehdizadeh was born in Hastings, East Sussex. His father is Iranian, and his mother is English. He is the eldest of 4 siblings.

His early career started at the Questors Theatre in Ealing, where he appeared in a youth production of 'Godspell', when he was 14. He then went on to perform at the Regent's Park Open Air Theatre in a production of 'Watership Down', where he played Cowslip. He also regularly appeared in popular BBC children's programme 'Grange Hill'.

Education 
Mehdizadeh graduated from the University of Wales, Aberystwyth in 2007 (where he read Drama).

Whilst studying, he also founded the long-running Curtain Call Musical Theatre Society. In 2016 the company  celebrated its 10th birthday with a gala performance at which Mehdizadeh gave a speech, and sung.

Other educational institutions attended include Richmond Upon Thames College, and Drayton Manor High School. At high school he appeared in school shows with actors such as Adebayo Bolaji, Sian Clifford, and Anthony Welsh.

Career 
In 2012, he originated the roles of Dad and The MC in a stage adaptation of Oliver Jeffers' book The Incredible Book Eating Boy at the Belfast arts venue, The MAC.

Mehdizadeh played Big Davey in the West End musical Billy Elliot the Musical, (which he played for two years between May 2013 and May 2015). Mehdizadeh also appeared in the same role for both the worldwide live cinema release, and the subsequent DVD release of the show. Mehdizadeh further, played the role of Big Davey at the 10th anniversary gala performance in May 2015.

In 2016, Alan was appearing in the UK premiere production of Swap!, written and directed by TV star Ian Ogilvy. The play toured the UK. Alan played Harry "The Hammer" Henson alongside several TV personalities (including Kim Tiddy & Louisa Lytton).

As of 15 August 2016, Mehdizadeh joined the West End production of Kinky Boots in the role of Don. The hit musical recently won Best New Musical at the 2016 Olivier Awards, and continues to play at the Adelphi Theatre in London. Mehdizadeh left the production in June 2018.

In 2021 he appeared in the TV series Whitstable Pearl starring  Kerry Godliman. His other recent TV credits include BBC series, The Outlaws (written and directed by Stephen Merchant), and The Power (for Amazon Prime).

Mehdizadeh played the role of Monk in the 2022 Graham Moore film The Outfit.

Mehdizadeh is also the founder, and artistic director of UK production company What Was That? Productions, with whom he has produced and appeared in many productions.

References

21st-century British male actors
1982 births
British male musical theatre actors
People from Hastings
Living people
British people of Iranian descent
Alumni of Richmond upon Thames College